Rideback may refer to:

Rideback (manga), a Japanese manga series
"Rideback" (song), a 2009 single by Mell
Rideback (production company), an American film production company